Aglaoschema mourei is a species of beetle in the family Cerambycidae. It was described by Napp in 1993.

References

Aglaoschema
Beetles described in 1993